Marcelo Asteggiano (born 4 August 1965) is an Argentine former footballer, who played as a defender, and a coach.

Career
Born in Rafaela, Asteggiano began playing football in local side Club Sportivo Ben Hur's youth system. He made his professional debut in the Argentine Primera División with Racing Club de Avellaneda. After a few seasons with Racing, Asteggiano embarked on a journeyman period where he had brief spells with several clubs, including Cruz Azul and Peñarol. He made his name in Peru, winning the 1993 league title with Club Universitario de Deportes.

After he retired from playing, Asteggiano began a career as a football coach. He was an assistant to José del Solar at Sporting Cristal, as the club won the 2005 league title. He later would become assistant to del Solar when he managed the Peru national football team. Asteggiano was appointed manager of Club Deportivo Universidad César Vallejo and Deportivo Coopsol before returning to Argentina to manage youth sides of his hometown clubs.

References

External links

1965 births
Living people
Argentine footballers
Association football defenders
Argentine Primera División players
Racing Club de Avellaneda footballers
Cruz Azul footballers
Club Atlético Huracán footballers
Club Universitario de Deportes footballers
Sporting Cristal footballers
Atlético de Rafaela footballers
Defensor Sporting players
Argentine football managers
People from Rafaela
Sportspeople from Santa Fe Province